The Mulato-Getudo or Mulato-Jetudo Fault is a sinistral oblique thrust fault in the departments of Tolima, Caldas and Antioquia in central Colombia.

Etymology 
The fault is named after the Mulatos and Jetudo Rivers, left tributaries of the Magdalena River.

Description 
The Mulato-Getudo Fault, in some parts called Jetudo Fault, extends along the eastern foothills of the Central Ranges of the Colombian Andes, where it marks the abrupt break in slope of the east-tilted Tertiary erosion surface of the Cordillera and the flat alluvial plains of the Magdalena River in the Middle Magdalena Valley. The fault forms a regional-scale degraded fault escarpment with an outstanding break in slope. It offsets Pliocene to Quaternary deposits and an extensive tilted erosional surface of probable Miocene to Pliocene age (pre-Mesa Formation, older than 1.5 Ma). The northern half of the fault is characterised by aligned drainages and broad valleys. The fault possibly underlies the Honda Group south of the La Miel River.

See also 

 List of earthquakes in Colombia
 Cimitarra Fault
 Ibagué Fault
 Romeral Fault System

References

Bibliography

Maps

Further reading 
 

Seismic faults of Colombia
Thrust faults
Strike-slip faults
Inactive faults
Faults
Faults
Faults
Faults